Varun Ram Ramasamy (born December 16, 1992) is an American basketball player who played for the Maryland Terrapins. He was one of the few players in the NCAA of Indian descent. Ram previously competed for Trinity College.

Collegiate career

Senior 
On March 20, 2015 in his first NCAA Division I men's basketball tournament appearance, Ram made a key play in the final seconds of a second-round game against Valparaiso. Crusaders guard Tevonn Walker made a free throw with one minute remaining in the second half, making the score 65–62 in Maryland's favor. Following a missed opportunity to close the game from Dez Wells, Valparaiso's Keith Carter attempted to take the final three-point shot and a potential game-tying field goal with a second left in regulation. However, Ram, who was primarily guarding him, smacked the ball away and began to run around the court very hyped up. He said after the game, "I've been envisioning this my whole life. And being able to actually do it, for it to happen, is amazing. I feel like it's a dream come true. A game of this magnitude, it's unbelievable." Terrapins head coach Mark Turgeon remarked that Ram was one of his top five funniest players. He did not accumulate any statistics throughout the contest, though, because Evan Smotrycz was given credit for the steal.

Personal 
Ram is the son of Kolandavel and Santhini Ramasamy. He is a Tamil and his parents were born and brought up in Tamil Nadu, a state in the Southern part of India. They migrated in the late 80s to find a job, have a better standard of living, and support their family back in the motherland. His sister, Anita, attended Johns Hopkins University for both her undergraduate degree as well as medical school. Varun has been considered the Maryland basketball team's smartest player, with a 3.99 grade-point average in neurology and physiology. He is well known for his grit, determination, and perseverance in both athletics and academics. After he graduates UMD, he wants to work in Medical consulting. He was also thinking of playing basketball for an overseas professional team or the Indian National team (unfortunately at this point however he is ineligible).

In addition, Ram is a volunteer coaching fellow with Crossover Basketball and Scholars Academy (www.crossover-india.org); an organization committed to impacting education rates in India (Chennai at this time) through the use of basketball as a vehicle of change and imparting the skills of leadership, character, teamwork, and communication.

Regarding his Tamil culture, he is also a participant and organizer in  FeTNA, the Federation of Tamil Sangams of North America and the Tamil Sangam of Greater Washington. These are Tamil cultural conventions for Tamil Americans to keep in touch with their Tamil culture since they cannot travel to Tamil Nadu, India all the time. Teammate Melo Trimble said, "Varun, he's probably the smartest guy on the team."

References 

1992 births
Living people
American men's basketball players
American sportspeople of Indian descent
Basketball players from Maryland
Guards (basketball)
Maryland Terrapins men's basketball players
People from Howard County, Maryland
Trinity Bantams men's basketball players